The 1975–76 Japan Ice Hockey League season was the tenth season of the Japan Ice Hockey League. Six teams participated in the league, and the Seibu Tetsudo won the championship.

Regular season

External links
 Japan Ice Hockey Federation

Japan
Japan Ice Hockey League seasons
Japan